Earlston railway station, in the Scottish Borders village of Earlston, was a station on the now disused Berwickshire Railway.There were two platforms (the location served as a passing loop) and two sidings, cattle dock and goods shed. The station closed to passenger traffic in 1948, and the last freight service operated on Friday 16 July 1965. The station closed completely, along with the line, on Monday 19 July 1965.

See also
 List of closed railway stations in Britain

References

 http://www.railbrit.co.uk/Berwickshire_Railway/frame.htm
 https://web.archive.org/web/20080827163513/http://www.wrha.org.uk/maps_grads.html

External links
 Earlston station on navigable 1926 O. S. map

Disused railway stations in the Scottish Borders
Railway stations in Great Britain opened in 1863
Railway stations in Great Britain closed in 1948
Former North British Railway stations
Earlston